Gwilym Peter Lewis (born 1952) is a British botanist, a curator at the Royal Botanic Gardens, Kew, and a leading expert on neotropical Leguminosae.

Education and career
Lewis graduated in 1973 with a B.Sc. from the University of London. He eventually became the head of the legume section at the Royal Botanic Gardens, Kew, which he joined in 1974. In his research on the legume family he has contributed to the description of 58 species and 11 genera. He has also contributed to several taxonomic revisions, especially for the genus Caesalpinia. In 1994 he received a Ph.D. from the University of St. Andrews. His doctoral dissertation, supervised by Peter Edward Gibbs, is entitled Systematic studies in neotropical 'Caesalpinia L.' (Leguminosae: Caesalpinioideae), including a revision of the 'Poincianella-Erythrostemon group' .

Lewis has collected thousands of botanical specimens and has done botanical "fieldwork in Brazil, Cuba, Argentina, Ecuador, Central America, Mexico and Madagascar". He has been a plant co-collector with over twenty different botanists. During his career at the Royal Botanic Gardens, Kew, his research has focused on "systematics, phylogenetics, biogeography, diversity and comparative biology of neotropical (mainly South American) Leguminosae, especially Caesalpinioideae (particularly Caesalpinia) and Mimosoideae. Floristic studies focus on the drylands and wet tropics of Brazil and the Andes of Ecuador, including monographic work on the large genus Caesalpinia."

His numerous scientific articles (over 250 as author or co-author) have been published in leading journals such as Brittonia, Curtis's Botanical Magazine and Kew Bulletin. The book Legumes of the World, of which he is the lead author, has been awarded the 2006 Annual Literature Award in the Technical Category from the Council on Botanical and Horticultural Libraries.

In 1995 Lewis received the Rupert Barneby Award from the New York Botanical Garden to enable him, as a visiting researcher for the year 1996, to do research on the legume family of Ecuador. He is a member of the American Society of Plant Taxonomists, the Botanical Society of America and the Organization for Flora Neotropica.

Selected publications

Articles

Books

References

External links
 
 
 

1952 births
Living people
20th-century British botanists
21st-century British botanists
Alumni of the University of London
Alumni of the University of St Andrews
Botanists active in Kew Gardens